The North Branch Blackwater River is a  river in Squa Pan Township (Township 10, Range 4, WELS), Aroostook County, Maine. From its source, the stream runs west to its confluence with the South Branch to form the Blackwater River. Via the Blackwater River, St. Croix Stream, and the Aroostook River, the North Branch is part of the Saint John River watershed.

See also
List of rivers of Maine

References

Maine Streamflow Data from the USGS
Maine Watershed Data From Environmental Protection Agency

Tributaries of the Saint John River (Bay of Fundy)
Rivers of Aroostook County, Maine